Salford Central might refer to:

 Salford Central railway station
 Salford Central F.C.